Claire Bren (born 17 September 1988) is a French female canoeist who won 13 medals at senior level at the Wildwater Canoeing World Championships.

References

External links
 

1988 births
Living people
French female canoeists
European Games competitors for France
Canoeists at the 2019 European Games